The 1981–82 Vancouver Canucks season was the team's 12th in the NHL. The Vancouver Canucks made their first appearance in the Stanley Cup Finals, losing to the New York Islanders 4 games to 0.

Regular season

Season standings
Note: GP = Games played, W = Wins, L = Losses, T = Ties, Pts = Points, GF = Goals for, GA = Goals against

Schedule and results

Playoffs

Player statistics

Skaters
Note: GP = Games played; G = Goals; A = Assists; Pts = Points; PIM = Penalty minutes

†Denotes player spent time with another team before joining Vancouver.  Stats reflect time with the Canucks only.

Denotes player traded by Vancouver midway through the season. Stats reflect time with Canucks only.

Goaltenders
Note: GP = Games played; Min = Minutes; W = Wins; L = Losses; T = Ties; GA = Goals against; SO = Shutouts; GAA = Goals against average

Awards and records

Trophies and awards
Cyclone Taylor Award (Canucks MVP): Richard Brodeur
Cyrus H. McLean Trophy (Canucks Leading Scorer): Thomas Gradin
Babe Pratt Trophy (Canucks Outstanding Defenceman): Harold Snespts
Fred J. Hume Award (Canucks Unsung Hero): Lars Lindgren
Most Exciting Player Award: Thomas Gradin
Molson Cup (Most Three-Star selections): Richard Brodeur

Records achieved in the season
Note: Only records that stand as of 2007–08 are listed

Canucks team records
Fewest losses at home: (8) - repeated in 1994-95
Most ties at home: (12) - repeated in 1977-78
Longest road losing streak: 12 games, November 28, 1981 - February 7, 1982

Canucks individual records
Most points, rookie: Ivan Hlinka (60) - repeated in 1991-92 (Pavel Bure)
Most goals, one game: Rosaire Paiement (4) - repeated eleven times

Records achieved in the playoffs

Canucks team records
Most penalty minutes, one series: 285, 1982 Campbell Conference Finals versus Chicago Black Hawks
Shortest overtime: 1:23, April 18, 1982, versus Los Angeles Kings (Colin Campbell)
Most penalty minutes, one game: 106, April 29, 1982, versus Chicago Black Hawks
Most penalty minutes, one game by opponent: 90, May 6, 1982, versus Chicago Black Hawks
Most penalty minutes, one game by both teams: 188, April 29, 1982, versus Chicago Black Hawks
Fewest shots on goal, one game: 16, April 19, 1982, versus Los Angeles Kings
Most goals against, one game: 4, May 11, 1982, versus New York Islanders (repeated 5 times)
Most shots on goal by opponent, one period: 19, April 29, 1982, versus Chicago Black Hawks (repeated in 1994)
Fastest goal to start game: 0:08, April 7, 1982, versus Calgary Flames (Stan Smyl)
Fastest goal to start period: 0:08, April 7, 1982, versus Calgary Flames (Stan Smyl)

Canucks individual records
Most penalty minutes, one year: Tiger Williams (116)
Longest assist streak: Lars Mollin (5)
Most penalty minutes, one series: Tiger Williams versus Chicago Black Hawks (51)
Fastest two goals in one period, opposition: Mike Bossy, New York Islanders, May 16, 1982 (3:00 in 2nd period)

Transactions
The Canucks were involved in the following transactions during the 1981-82 season.

Trades

Draft picks
Vancouver's picks at the 1981 NHL Entry Draft. The draft was held at the Montreal Forum in Montreal, Quebec.

References

See also
1981–82 NHL season

Vancouver Canucks seasons
Western Conference (NHL) championship seasons
Vancouver C
Vancouver
Van